The San Giorgio class are amphibious transport docks (LPD) built by Fincantieri for the Italian Navy. These ships can carry a battalion of troops, and up to 36 armored vehicles. The stern floodable dock can accommodate three landing craft. The ships are based at the Brindisi naval base on the Adriatic coast.

San Giorgio and San Marco have been extensively modified into landing helicopter docks. They accommodate a full-length flight deck with four landing spots. San Giusto, the third vessel, has not been modified since construction, however featured an improved design, and is normally employed as a training ship.

Ships

Replacement class
The two oldest vessels of this class are scheduled for replacement.

Improved San Giorgio or Landing and Logistic Support Ship 
In July 2011 the Algerian Navy placed an order with Fincantieri for an improved version of the San Giorgio class amphibious transport ships classified as Bâtiment de Débarquement et de Soutien Logistique (BDSL). On 8 January 2014 the BDSL was launched on a barge at the Fincantieri shipyard in Sestri Levante.

 is fitted with Aster 15 behind the island superstructure, with one OTO Melara 76 mm Super Rapid at the bow and with two 25 mm remote weapon stations.

The BDSL can accommodate three landing craft mechanized, three small landing craft vehicle personnel, one large landing craft personnel and two semi-rigid boats. The hangar can accommodate up to 15 armoured vehicles.

The crew will consist of 150 sailors while the ship may accommodate a landing force of 440 soldiers.

References

External links 

 San Giorgio – Naval Technology

 
Amphibious warfare vessel classes
 San Giorgio class
Amphibious warfare vessels of the Italian Navy
Helicopter carrier classes
Ships built by Fincantieri